Odo of Wetterau (c. 895 – 2 December 949) was a prominent German nobleman of the 10th century.

In 914, Odo was appointed Count of Wetterau and founded St. Mary's Church in Wetzlar. The Wetterau had been one of the counties of his father Gebhard, and Odo also acquired two other counties that had been his: Rheingau in 917 and Lahngau in 918.

Odo is best known for the Battle of Andernach on 2 October 939. The rebellious dukes Gilbert II of Maasgau and Eberhard of Franconia had looted the counties of Odo and his nephew Conrad (Count of Lower Lahngau) east of the Rhine. Their force was so great that Odo and Conrad could not resist them. But when the insurgents crossed the Rhine again at Andernach to return to Lorraine, Odo and Conrad had a chance. Gilbert and Eberhard were still at their rear on the eastern shore when the bulk of the army had made the crossing. At that moment Odo and Conrad fell and defeated the troops who were left behind. Eberhard was thereby slain and Gilbert drowned when he tried to flee on the Rhine. The rebellion was thus broken and Emperor Otto I the Great could easily recover his authority. Odo thus became a favorite of Otto: at the death of Conrad (949), he was also appointed Count of Lower Lahngau.

He married a daughter of Herbert I, Count of Vermandois, presumably named Cunigunda. They had the following children:
Gebhard (d. 938), killed in the fight against the insurgency of Thankmar, the elder half-brother of Emperor Otto.
Herbert (c. 930 – 992)
Otto
Odo (d. 26 August 965), appointed Bishop of Strasbourg on 13 August 950, possibly the same person as his brother Otto.
Judith
Conrad I, Duke of Swabia

Ancestry

890s births
949 deaths
Year of birth uncertain